Estonia participated in the Eurovision Song Contest 2004 with the song "Tii" written by Priit Pajusaar, Glen Pilvre and Aapo Ilves. The song was performed by the group Neiokõsõ. The Estonian broadcaster Eesti Televisioon (ETV) organised the national final Eurolaul 2004 in order to select the Estonian entry for the 2004 contest in Istanbul, Turkey. Ten songs competed in the national final and "Tii" performed by Neiokõsõ was selected as the winner entirely by a public vote.

Estonia competed in the semi-final of the Eurovision Song Contest which took place on 12 May 2004. Performing during the show in position 17, "Tii" was not announced among the top 10 entries of the semi-final and therefore did not qualify to compete in the final. It was later revealed that Estonia placed eleventh out of the 22 participating countries in the semi-final with 57 points.

Background 

In 2003, the song "Eighties Coming Back" performed by Ruffus placed twenty-first in the final.

The Estonian national broadcaster, Eesti Televisioon (ETV), broadcasts the event within Estonia and organises the selection process for the nation's entry. Since their debut, the Estonian broadcaster has organised national finals that feature a competition among multiple artists and songs in order to select Estonia's entry for the Eurovision Song Contest. The Eurolaul competition has been organised since 1996 in order to select Estonia's entry and on 1 October 2003, ETV announced the organisation of Eurolaul 2004 in order to select the nation's 2004 entry.

Before Eurovision

Eurolaul 2004 
Eurolaul 2004 was the eleventh edition of the Estonian national selection Eurolaul, which selected Estonia's entry for the Eurovision Song Contest 2004. The competition consisted of a ten-song final on 7 February 2004 at the ETV studios in Tallinn, hosted by Marko Reikop and Karmel Eikner and broadcast on ETV. The national final was watched by 384,300 viewers in Estonia with a market share of 58.6%, making it the most watched Eurolaul competition since 1996.

Competing entries 
On 1 October 2003, ETV opened the submission period for artists and composers to submit their entries up until 8 December 2003. A record 153 submissions were received by the deadline—breaking the previous record of 100, set during the 2003 edition. A 10-member jury panel selected 10 finalists from the submissions and the selected songs were announced on 11 December 2003 and among the competing artists were previous Eurovision Song Contest entrants Maarja, who represented Estonia in 1996 and 1997, and Tanel Padar (performing with Slobodan River), who represented Estonia in 2001 together with Dave Benton and 2XL. The selection jury consisted of Jaak Joala (musician), Meelis Kapstas (journalist), Jaan Karp (musician), Priit Hõbemägi (culture critic), Tõnu Kõrvits (composer), Kaari Sillamaa (composer), Heidi Pruuli (producer), Andres Jõesaar (media director), Tiit Kikas (musician) and Jaan Elgula (musician).

Final 
The final took place on 7 February 2004. Ten songs competed during the show and "Tii" performed by Neiokõsõ was selected as the winner entirely by a public televote, revealed by Estonia's four regions alongside votes submitted via mobiles. Despite the public televote having registered 60,387 votes, only 19,478 votes were ultimately counted due to the remaining votes being submitted after the voting period.

At Eurovision

It was announced that the competition's format would be expanded to include a semi-final in 2004. According to the rules, all nations with the exceptions of the host country, the "Big Four" (France, Germany, Spain and the United Kingdom) and the ten highest placed finishers in the 2003 contest are required to qualify from the semi-final on 12 May 2004 in order to compete for the final on 15 May 2004; the top ten countries from the semi-final progress to the final. On 23 March 2004, a special allocation draw was held which determined the running order for the semi-final and Estonia was set to perform in position 17, following the entry from Slovenia and before the entry from Croatia. At the end of the semi-final, Estonia was not announced among the top 10 entries in the semi-final and therefore failed to qualify to compete in the final. It was later revealed that Estonia placed 11th in the semi-final, receiving a total of 47 points.

The semi-final and the final were broadcast in Estonia on ETV with commentary by Marko Reikop. The Estonian spokesperson, who announced the Estonian votes during the final, was Maarja-Liis Ilus who had previously represented Estonia in the Eurovision Song Contest in 1996 and 1997.

Voting 
Below is a breakdown of points awarded to Estonia and awarded by Estonia in the semi-final and grand final of the contest. The nation awarded its 12 points to Ukraine in the semi-final and the final of the contest.

Points awarded to Estonia

Points awarded by Estonia

References

2004
Countries in the Eurovision Song Contest 2004
Eurovision